Henri Verdun (1895–1977) was a French composer of film scores.

Selected filmography
 Napoléon (1927)
 The Sweetness of Loving (1930)
 The Levy Department Stores (1932)
 The Lacquered Box (1932)
 The Weaker Sex (1933)
 The Flame (1936)
 Girls of Paris (1936)
 The Assault (1936)
 Les Disparus de Saint-Agil (1938)
 The Woman Thief (1938)
 Ernest the Rebel (1938)
 Rail Pirates (1938)
 The Fatted Calf (1939)
 Camp Thirteen (1940)
 The Man Without a Name (1943)
 The Bellman (1945)
 My First Love (1945)
 The Murderer is Not Guilty (1946)
 Distress (1946)
 The Fugitive (1947)
 The Ironmaster (1948)
 The Ladies in the Green Hats (1949)
 La Fugue de Monsieur Perle (1952)
 The Lovers of Midnight (1953)
 The Big Flag (1954)
 Blood to the Head (1956)

References

Bibliography 
 Greco, Joseph. The File on Robert Siodmak in Hollywood, 1941-1951. Universal-Publishers, 1999.

External links 
 Henri Verdun on data.bnf.fr
 

People from Roubaix
1895 births
1977 deaths
French operetta composers
French film score composers